Ahmad Shakir Md Ali (born 9 January 1989) is a Malaysian footballer who plays as a striker for PDRM FA, on loan from PKNS FC. His main attributes is physical power along with subtle touch.

Career

Harimau Muda A
Shakir started his football career as a striker for Kedah President Cup Team. He then plays for Harimau Muda A where he achieve his personal best season by scoring 16 league goals in the 2009 Malaysia Premier League season, the Malaysia second tier professional football league.

Kedah FA
He then decided to leave the Young Tigers, for a return to his boyhood team, Kedah in order for him to be closer to his sick father at that time. However his from drop significantly and regularly found himself out of the first team line-up.

Negeri Sembilan FA
Struggling for first team actions, he then make another move. This time to newly crowned Malaysia Cup winners, Negeri Sembilan who are losing their main striker Hairuddin Omar to big-spending Premier League club ATM.

He scored his first league goals for Negeri Sembilan 2–0 win over Johor FC, scoring both goals.

Kelantan FA
After his contract with Negeri Sembilan ended, he decided to join Kelantan FA and signed two years contract. On 4 February 2014,Shakir scored his first ever goal with Kelantan in first round FA Cup match 2–1 win against Sabah FA. On 18 March 2014,Shakir was sent off in 34th minute after kicked Vissai Ninh Binh player, Le Van Thang.

International career
He is a member of the Malaysia national team and in summer 2009 he played twice against Manchester United in their pre season tour of the Far East.

Later in August the same year, he has been called up by K. Rajagobal again to play against Kenya, China and Saudi Arabia. He scored his first goal for Malaysia against Saudi Arabia, which Malaysia lost 2–1.

After more than 2 years, Shakir was recalled to the national team, due to his impressive performance in the league for Negeri Sembilan. He scored his second senior goal, when his equalising goal gave Malaysia a 1–1 draw against Philippines in a friendly match on 29 February 2012. Shakir scored his fourth senior goal against Singapore which Malaysia won by 2–0.

Shakir have also played for the Malaysia U-23 for the 2012 Olympic qualifiers.

Honours
Harimau Muda A
 Malaysia Premier League:2009

Kedah FA
 Malaysia FA Cup:Runner-up 2010

Negeri Sembilan FA
 Sultan Haji Ahmad Shah Cup:2012

International goals

References

External links
 

Malaysian footballers
Malaysia international footballers
Kedah Darul Aman F.C. players
Negeri Sembilan FA players
Kelantan FA players
Living people
1989 births
People from Kedah
Association football forwards